Ucan or UCAN may refer to:
 Catholic University of Angola, Luanda, Angola
 Uchen script, a style of the Tibetan alphabet
 Union of Catholic Asian News, a news agency
 United Coalition for Animals, an American animal welfare organization
 University of Canberra, Australia
 University and College Accountability Network, an American university ranking database
 Salih Uçan (born 1994), Turkish footballer